The 1992 North Carolina lieutenant gubernatorial election was held on November 3, 1992. Democratic nominee Dennis A. Wicker defeated Republican nominee Art Pope with 53.50% of the vote.

Primary elections
Primary elections were held on May 5, 1992.

Democratic primary

Candidates
Dennis A. Wicker, State Representative
 James W. Crawford Jr., State Representative
Ed Renfrow, State Auditor of North Carolina
C. Philip Ginn, District judge

Results

Republican primary

Candidates
Art Pope, State Representative
Doris Huffman, State Representative
Frank J. "Trip" Sizemore III, former State Representative

Results

General election

Candidates
Major party candidates
Dennis A. Wicker, Democratic
Art Pope, Republican

Other candidates
Jeannette Small, Libertarian

Results

References

North Carolina
1992
Gubernatorial